Mohammed Hafez or Mohammed Hafeez may refer to:

Mohammed Hafez (academic) Specialist in islamic movements
Mohamad Hafez (born 1984), Syrian-American artist and architect
Mohamed Hafez El-Sayed (born 1963), Egyptian weightlifter
Mohammed Hafez Ismail (1919 – 1997), Egyptian statesman